Li Qian (born 19 October 1985) is a Chinese rower. She competed in the women's lightweight double sculls event at the 2004 Summer Olympics.

References

1985 births
Living people
Chinese female rowers
Olympic rowers of China
Rowers at the 2004 Summer Olympics